Chittattukara is a Town in Elavally village in Thrissur district in the state of Kerala, India. The Elavally Panchayath Office and the Village Office are situated there. All commodities are sold there. The Market area of Chittattukara is covered by a kilometre. Most of the buildings in that market are as old as over 300 years.

Cultural Heritage

There are three Catholic Syrian Churches in Chittattukara from East to West and the market is dominated by the Christians since many centuries. There are three major schools: 
1. The church school.
2.vidya vihar central  school.
3.Sree Gokulam Public School.

Professor P.K. Koru, the 20th century Astronomer, Mathematician was from Chittattukara  of the Elavally village, who wrote a Malayalam commentary to Puthumana Somayaji's Karanapaddhati, is a mathematical treatise in Sanskrit, which had printed in Malayalam script. As an independent political leader he represented Guruvayur Constituency to the Kerala Legislative Assembly  between 1957 and 1959. Nakshatra Dipika, Malayalam Technical Lexicon, Jyotisha Balabodhini are his other major works. Also see the link:

Facilities
Ayurvedic Medical Shops, Allopathic Medical Shops, Rice Mills, Oil Mills, Petrol Pump, Stationery shops, Grocery shops, Vegetable Markets, Bakery, Fish Markets, Meat Markets etc. are available here.

References

chittattukara perunnal
chittattukara kambidi perunnal was so famous
Villages in Thrissur district